Gorda (Spanish for "Fat") is a hamlet in Monterey County, California. It is one of the three small settlements of filling stations, restaurants, and motels located along State Route 1 on the Big Sur coast. The ZIP Code is 93920, but mail must be addressed to Big Sur, and the community is inside area code 805.

History 

The fresh springs in Gorda were used by Native American tribes. The first Europeans arrived in 1878, when a stagecoach stop was built. The settlement expanded with the Gold Rush in nearby Manchester during the 1880s. A post office operated at Gorda from 1893 to 1923, moving in 1910. Government surveyor James M. Hill described the town in February, 1921 as "a small ranching settlement on the coast about midway between Monterey and San Luis Obispo."

Road-side services include a small hotel and cottages, restaurant, gas station, deli, espresso bar, and convenience store. In 1979, the town attracted national attention after most of the land was purchased by Kidco Limited Ventures, a corporation owned by four minor children from Ramona, California who were heirs of the family that owned the Cessna Aircraft company. After funding the company, $500,000 was invested as a tax shelter to purchase the town's land. At the time, Dickie Cessna was 14 years old and the other three siblings were June (16), Bette (13) and Nene (11). The Cessna children were paid for rights to a movie about these events and the comedy film Kidco was released by 20th Century in 1984.

Mud Creek slide 

The highway was closed for more than a year. This had a considerable negative economic impact for tourism between Monterey and Morro Bay. A CalTrans study concluded that rerouting the highway around the slide was preferred over other alternatives. The only route in and out of Gorda beginning in the south was via a lengthy detour over the narrow, winding Nacimiento-Fergusson Road. On August 2, 2017, CalTrans decided to rebuild the highway over the slide instead of clearing it. It was reopened on July 18, 2018 at a cost of $54 million.

Etymology 

Gorda is derived from the Spanish word for "fat" or "well-fed".

High fuel prices 
Gorda is occasionally mentioned as having the highest gasoline prices in the United States. This is due in part to the cost of a diesel generator that provides electricity to the gas station and town. In 2008, the price was $6.70 per gallon. In October 2021, the prices were $7.59 for unleaded and $8.49 for premium gas. On March 10, 2022, the price of unleaded was reported to be $9.159 and the price of premium gas was $10.159.

Geography 

Under the Köppen climate classification, "dry-summer subtropical" climates are often referred to as "Mediterranean".

Climate

Government 

At the county level, Gorda is represented on the Monterey County Board of Supervisors by Supervisor Dave Potter.

References 

Unincorporated communities in California
Unincorporated communities in Monterey County, California
Populated coastal places in California
Big Sur